Gesneria is a genus of approximately 50 species in the flowering plant family Gesneriaceae.  Except for two or three odd South American species, all are native to islands of the Caribbean. The genus is classified in the tribe Gesnerieae along with the genera Bellonia, Pheidonocarpa, and Rhytidophyllum.  Gesneria species are usually woody shrubs or subshrubs, and (with the closely related Rhytidophyllum) are unusual in the family in having alternately (rather than decussately) arranged leaves. A complete list of the accepted species and their synonyms can be found in the Smithsonian Institution's World Checklist of Gesneriaceae.

The genus name honors Conrad Gessner.

Selected species
Gesneria acaulis
Gesneria calycina
Gesneria calycosa
Gesneria christii
Gesneria citrina
Gesneria cuneifolia
Gesneria depressa
Gesneria exserta
Gesneria humilis
Gesneria pauciflora
Gesneria pedicellaris
Gesneria pedunculosa
Gesneria reticulata
Gesneria ventricosa

External links
Skog, L.E. 1976. A Study of the Tribe Gesnerieae, with a Revision of Gesneria (Gesneriaceae: Gesnerioideae). Smithsonian Contributions to Botany. 29: 1-182 (pdf file).
Gesneria from The Genera of Gesneriaceae
Gesneria from The Gesneriad Reference Web
World Checklist of Gesneriaceae

 
Gesneriaceae genera